Mohamed Abdullah (born May 23, 1981) is an Egyptian footballer who currently plays for El-Entag El-Harby.

Career
A talented defender in the right back berth for Ittihad, he has a strong shooting ability and good ball control skills.

Abdullah transferred to Konyaspor in January 2007, through a 6-month loan, from African Champions el-Ahly. He was not a regular at el-Ahly, but he started the final match against CS Sfaxien in the CAF Champions League 2006.

Abdullah won the 2005 and 2006 CAF Champions League.

Honours
El-Ismaily
 Winner of Egyptian League (2001–2002).
 Winner of Egyptian Soccer Cup (2000).

El-Ahly
 Bronze Medalist at FIFA Club World Cup 2006.
 Winner of CAF Champions League 2006.
 Winner of CAF Champions League 2005.
 Winner of Egyptian League (2005–2006).
 Winner of African Super Cup (2006).
 Winner of Egyptian Soccer Cup (2006).
 Winner of Egyptian Super Cup (2006).
 Winner of Egyptian Super Cup (2005).

Zamalek
 Winner of Egypt Cup (2008).

References

External links

1981 births
Living people
Egyptian footballers
Egypt international footballers
Al Ahly SC players
Zamalek SC players
Ismaily SC players
Konyaspor footballers
Expatriate footballers in Turkey
Al Ittihad Alexandria Club players
Egyptian expatriate sportspeople in Turkey
Association football defenders
Egyptian Premier League players
People from Benha